Erik Zachrisson (born 8 September 1980) is a Swedish speed skater. He competed in two events at the 2006 Winter Olympics.

References

External links
 

1980 births
Living people
Swedish male speed skaters
Olympic speed skaters of Sweden
Speed skaters at the 2006 Winter Olympics
Sportspeople from Norrköping
21st-century Swedish people